Boğaziçi is a working fishing village on the shore of Lake Tuzla in the Milas district of Muğla Province, Turkey. Today a number of fish restaurants line the shoreline.

In ancient times this was the site of the ancient Carian city of Bargylia.  Bargylia was said to have been founded by Bellerophon in honour of his companion Bargylos, who had been killed by a kick from Pegasus. Ruins of the ancient city of Bargylia, including a Roman temple can be seen scattered around the locality.

Boğaziçi is located only 10 minutes from Milas–Bodrum Airport and is home to the resort of Lakeside Garden which is the base for bird watchers who descend on the area to see greater flamingos flock to the protected Lake Tuzla during the winter months.

Villages in Muğla Province
Milas District